Li Wenxi (born March 1950) is a retired Chinese politician who spent his entire career in his home-province Liaoning. As of January 2021 he was under investigation by China's top anti-corruption agency. He is the first leader of provincial-ministerial level to be targeted by China's top anticorruption watchdog in 2021.

Career
Li was born in Benxi County, Liaoning, in March 1950. He entered the workforce in June 1969, and joined the Chinese Communist Party in May 1972. 

In February 1990 he became deputy magistrate of Benxi County. In November 1992 he became the deputy head of Benxi Municipal Public Security Bureau, rising to head and party chief in April 1994. He concurrently served as vice mayor in May 1996.

Two years later, he was elevated to head and party chief. He held the head position for almost nine years. In January 2008 he concurrently served as vice chairman of the Liaoning Provincial Committee of the Chinese People's Political Consultative Conference. He retired in January 2013.

Downfall
On January 25, 2021, he was put under investigation for alleged "serious violations of discipline and laws" by the Central Commission for Discipline Inspection (CCDI), the party's internal disciplinary body, and the National Supervisory Commission, the highest anti-corruption agency of China. 

His younger brother, Li Wen'an, once demanded a local entrepreneur Yuan Chengjia for the mining right of a mineral resources.

Before he stepped down, his subordinates, Wang Like (deputy head of Liaoning Provincial Public Security Department), Bai Yuexian (deputy head of Liaoning Provincial Public Security Department), and Zhang Dewei (chief of Food and Drug Crime Investigation Team), were caught up in Xi Jinping's anti-graft campaign in 2020.

On 26 July 2021, he was expelled from the Communist Party and his retirement benefits was abolished. Li's illegal gains will be confiscated and his case transferred to the judiciary.

On 6 January 2023, Li was sentenced to death with a two-year reprieve by the Tai'an Intermediate People's Court for taking bribes exceeding 540 million yuan, his political rights for life was revoked  and the confiscation of all his property was ordered. After the reprieve, Li's sentence will be commuted to life in prison without parole. The ill-gotten gains will be confiscated and handed over to the state treasury.

References

1950 births
Living people
People from Benxi
Chinese Academy of Social Sciences alumni
People's Republic of China politicians from Liaoning
Chinese Communist Party politicians from Liaoning